The Grand-Place (French, ; "Grand Square"; also used in English) or Grote Markt (Dutch, ; "Big Market") is the central square of Brussels, Belgium. It is surrounded by opulent Baroque guildhalls of the former Guilds of Brussels and two larger edifices; the city's Flamboyant Town Hall, and the neo-Gothic King's House or Bread House building, containing the Brussels City Museum. The square measures  and is entirely paved.

The Grand-Place's construction began in the 11th century and was largely complete by the 17th. In 1695, during the Nine Years' War, most of the square was destroyed during the bombardment of Brussels by French troops. Only the facade and the tower of the Town Hall, which served as a target for the artillery, and some stone walls resisted the incendiary balls. The houses that surrounded the Grand-Place were rebuilt during subsequent years, giving the square its current appearance, though they were frequently modified in the following centuries. From the mid-19th century, the square's heritage value was rediscovered, and it was thoroughly renovated.

Nowadays, the Grand-Place is the most important tourist destination and most memorable landmark in Brussels. It is also considered one of the world's most beautiful squares, and has been a UNESCO World Heritage Site since 1998. The square frequently hosts festive and cultural events, among them, in August of every even year, the installation of an immense flower carpet in its centre. It is also a centre of annual celebrations during the Christmas and New Year period, and a Christmas tree has been erected annually on the square since the mid-20th century.

This site is served by the premetro (underground tram) station Bourse/Beurs (on lines 3 and 4), as well as the bus stop / (on line 95).

Naming

Originally, the main square was the geographical centre of the towns and cities in these regions (for example the Grand-Place of Mons, Tournai, Arras, or Lille). The Grand-Place of Brussels is the location of the city's Town Hall, and thus its political centre.

Nowadays, the names Grand-Place (with a hyphen) in French and Grote Markt (with one 'o') in Dutch are most commonly seen. The historical spellings Grand'Place (with an apostrophe) in French and Groote Markt (with a double 'o') in Dutch are outdated, but are also still in use in certain sources, such as on wall plaques giving the name of the square. This outdated French spelling is a grammatical exception; place being feminine, the modern French form would be Grande Place. In the Brabantian dialect of Brussels (known as Brusselian, and also sometimes referred to as Marols or Marollien), the Grand-Place is called Gruute Met.

History

Early history

In the 10th century, Charles, Duke of Lower Lorraine, constructed a fort on Saint-Géry Island, the furthest inland point at which the river Senne was still navigable. The installation of a fort at this point marks the origin of what would become Brussels. By the end of the 11th century, an open-air marketplace was set up on a dried-up marsh near the fort that was surrounded by sandbanks. A document from 1174 mentions this lower market not far from the port on the Senne. It was also well situated near the Church of St. Nicholas and along the Causeway, an important trade route between the prosperous regions of the Rhineland (in modern-day Germany) and the County of Flanders.

At the beginning of the 13th century, three covered markets were built on the northern edge of the Grand-Place; a meat market, a bread market, and a cloth market. These buildings, which belonged to the Duke of Brabant, allowed the wares to be showcased even in bad weather, but also allowed the Dukes to keep track of the storage and sale of goods, in order to collect taxes. Other buildings, largely constructed of thatch and timber, with some made of stone, enclosed the Grand-Place. Although none of these  remain, their names live on in nearby streets, such as the Plattesteen, the Cantersteen, or the /. In the middle of the market square stood a primitive public fountain. In 1302, it was replaced by a large stone fountain with eight water jets and eight basins, directly in front of the bread market.

Rise in importance
Improvements to the Grand-Place from the 14th century onwards would mark the rise in importance of local merchants and tradesmen relative to the nobility. As he was short on money, the Duke gradually transferred parts of his control rights over trade and mills to the local authorities, prompting them to build edifices worthy of their new status. In 1353, the City of Brussels ordered the construction of a large indoor cloth market, similar to those of the neighbouring cities of Mechelen and Leuven, to the south of the square. At this point, the Grand-Place was still haphazardly laid out, and the buildings along the edges had a motley tangle of gardens and irregular additions. The city expropriated and demolished a number of buildings that clogged the square, and formally defined its edges.

Brussels' Town Hall was erected in stages, between 1401 and 1455, on the south side of the Grand-Place, transforming the square into the seat of municipal power. To counter this, from 1504 to 1536, the Duke of Brabant ordered the construction of a large Flamboyant edifice across from the city hall to house his administrative services. It was erected on the site of the first cloth and bread markets, which were no longer in use, and it became known first as the Duke's House, then as the King's House, although no king has ever lived there. Over time, wealthy merchants and the increasingly powerful Guilds of Brussels built houses around the square.

The Grand-Place witnessed many tragic events unfold during its history. In 1523, the first Protestant martyrs Henri Voes and Jean Van Eschen were burned by the Inquisition on the square. Forty years later, in 1568, two statesmen, Lamoral, Count of Egmont and Philip de Montmorency, Count of Horn, who had spoken out against the policies of King Philip II in the Spanish Netherlands, were beheaded in front of the King's House. This triggered the beginning of the armed revolt against Spanish rule, of which William of Orange took the lead. In 1719, it was the turn of François Anneessens, dean of the Nation of St. Christopher, who was beheaded on the Grand-Place because of his resistance to innovations in city government detrimental to the power of the guilds and for his suspected involvement with uprisings within the Austrian Netherlands.

Destruction and rebuilding

On 13 August 1695, during the Nine Years' War, a 70,000-strong French army under Marshal François de Neufville, duc de Villeroy, began a bombardment of Brussels in an effort to draw the League of Augsburg's forces away from their siege on French-held Namur in what is now Wallonia. The French launched a massive bombardment of the mostly defenceless city centre with cannons and mortars, setting it on fire and flattening the majority of the Grand-Place and the surrounding city. Only the stone shell of the Town Hall and a few fragments of other buildings remained standing. That the Town Hall survived at all is ironic, as it was the principal target of the artillery fire.

After the bombardment, the Grand-Place was swiftly rebuilt in the following four years by the city's guilds and other owners. Their efforts were regulated by the city's councillors and the Governor of Brussels, who required that their plans be submitted to the authorities for approval, and fines were threatened against those who did not comply. In addition, the alignments of the buildings were once again improved. This helped deliver a remarkably harmonious layout for the rebuilt square, despite the ostensibly clashing combination of Gothic, Baroque and Louis XIV style.

During the following two centuries, the Grand-Place underwent significant damage. In the late 18th century, French revolutionaries known as the sans-culottes sacked it, destroying statues of the nobility and symbols of Christianity. The guilds declined in importance in conjunction with the growing obsolescence of this form of economic organisation and the rise of proto-capitalism. They were abolished in 1795, under the French regime, and the guildhalls' furniture and archives were seized by the state and sold at public auction on the square in 1796. The remaining buildings were neglected and left in poor condition, with their facades painted, stuccoed and damaged by pollution. The square itself was proclaimed "Square of the People" by a decree of the 30 Ventôse An IV (1795) and a "Liberty tree" was planted on that occasion. At the first hours of Independence, in 1830, the Grand-Place became, for an extremely short time, the "Square of Regency".

By the late 19th century, a sensitivity arose about the heritage value of the buildings – the turning point was the demolition of the  guildhall in 1853 to widen the street on the left of the Town Hall in order to allow the passage of a horse-drawn tramway. Under the impulse of the city's then-mayor, Charles Buls, the authorities had the Grand-Place returned to its former splendour, with buildings restored or reconstructed. In 1856, a monumental fountain commemorating the twenty-fifth anniversary of the reign of King Leopold I was installed in the centre of the square. It was replaced in 1864 by a fountain surmounted by statues of the Counts of Egmont and Horn, which was erected in front of the King's House and later moved to the Square du Petit Sablon/Kleine Zavelsquare. Thirty years later, during the Belle Époque, a bandstand was raised in its place.

The Grand-Place attracted many famous visitors during that period, among them Victor Hugo, who resided in the  guildhall in 1851. In 1885, the Belgian Workers' Party (POB/BWP), the first socialist party in Belgium, was founded during a meeting at the Grand-Place, at the same place where the First International had convened, and where Karl Marx had written The Communist Manifesto in 1848.

20th and 21st centuries
At the start of World War I, as refugees flooded Brussels, the Grand-Place was filled with military and civilian casualties. The Town Hall served as a makeshift hospital. On 20 August 1914, at 2 p.m., the occupying German army arrived at the Grand-Place and set up field kitchens. The occupiers hoisted a German flag at the left side of the Town Hall. 

Neighbouring streets still reflect the area's origins, named after the sellers of butter, cheese, herring, coal, and so on. During the 1960s, in a low period of appreciation, the square served as a car parking area, but the parking spaces were removed in 1972 following a campaign by citizens. However, car traffic continued to pass through the square until 1990.

In 1979, the Grand-Place was bombed by the Irish Republican Army (IRA). A bomb planted under an open‐air stage where a British Army band was preparing to give a concert injured at least 15 persons, including four bandsmen, and caused extensive damage.

In 1990, the Grand-Place was pedestrianised, a first step in the pedestrianisation of central Brussels, and it is currently part of a large pedestrian zone in the centre of Brussels. The City of Brussels had been thinking about pedestrianising the square and its surrounding streets for several years, but a car park nearby prevented the project from materialising. When its licence ran out in September 1990, the city took the opportunity to conduct a pedestrian experiment. For three-and-a-half months, all traffic was to be banned on the Grand-Place, and also on the adjacent streets. After 1 January 1991, they would decide for good.

The Grand-Place was named by UNESCO as a World Heritage Site in 1998. The place is now primarily an important tourist attraction. A number of guildhalls have been converted into shops, terraced restaurants and brasseries. Notable institutions include Godiva chocolatier and Maison Dandoy speculoos confectionery. One of the houses owned by the brewers' guild is home to a brewers' museum. In addition, the Museum of Cocoa and Chocolate (now Choco-Story Brussels) was founded in July 1998 in the De Valck building, at 9–11, /, just off the Grand-Place.

Buildings around the square

Town Hall

The Town Hall is the central edifice on the Grand-Place. It was erected in stages, between 1401 and 1455, on the south side of the square, transforming it into the seat of municipal power. It is also the square's only remaining medieval building. The Town Hall not only housed the city's magistrate, but also, until 1795, the States of Brabant; the representation of the three estates (nobility, clergy and commoners) to the court of the Duke of Brabant. In 1830, the provisional government operated from there during the Belgian Revolution.

The oldest part of the present building is its east wing (to the left when facing the front). This wing, together with a shorter tower, was built between 1401 and 1421. The architect and designer is probably Jacob van Thienen  with whom Jean Bornoy collaborated. The young Duke Charles the Bold laid the first stone of the west wing in 1444. The architect of this part of the building is unknown.

The facade is decorated with numerous statues representing the local nobility (such as the Dukes and Duchesses of Brabant and knights of the Noble Houses of Brussels), saints, and allegorical figures. The present sculptures are mainly 19th- and 20th-century reproductions or creations; the original 15th-century ones are kept in the Brussels City Museum in the King's House or Bread House building across the Grand-Place.

The  tower in Brabantine Gothic style is the work of Jan van Ruysbroek, the court architect of Philip the Good. Above the roof of the Town Hall, the square tower body narrows to a lavishly pinnacled octagonal openwork. At its summit, stands a  gilt metal statue of Saint Michael, the patron saint of the City of Brussels, slaying a dragon or demon. This statue is a work by Michel de Martin Van Rode, and was placed on the tower in 1454 or 1455. It was removed in the 1990s and replaced by a copy. The original is also in the Brussels City Museum.

The Town Hall is asymmetrical, since the tower is not exactly in the middle of the building and the left part and the right part are not identical (although they seem at first sight). According to a legend, the architect of the building, upon discovering this "error", leapt to his death from the tower. More likely, the asymmetry of the Town Hall was an accepted consequence of the scattered construction history and space constraints.

After various waves of restoration, the interior of the Town Hall is dominated by neo-Gothic: the Maximilian Room, the States of Brabant Room and their antechamber with tapestries depicting the life of Clovis, the splendid Municipal Council Room, the likewise richly furnished ballroom and the Wedding Room (formerly the courtroom).

King's House

As early as the 12th century, the King's House was a wooden building where bread was sold, hence the name it kept in Dutch;  (Bread House or Bread Hall). The original building was replaced in the 15th century by a stone building which housed the administrative services of the Duke of Brabant, which is why it was first called the Duke's House, and when the same duke became King of Spain, it was renamed the King's House. In the 16th century, Holy Roman Emperor Charles V ordered his court architect  to rebuild it in a late Gothic style very similar to the contemporary design, although without towers or galleries.

The King's House was rebuilt after suffering extensive damage from the bombardment of 1695. A second restoration followed in 1767 when it received a neoclassical portal and a large roof pierced with three oeil-de-boeuf windows. It was reconstructed once again in its current neo-Gothic form by the architect  between 1874 and 1896, in the style of his mentor Eugène Viollet-le-Duc. On that occasion, Jamaer built two galleries and a central tower. He also adorned the facade with statues and other decorations. At the back, he added a new, much more sober wing in Flemish neo-Renaissance style. The new King's House was officially inaugurated in 1896. The current building, whose interior was renovated in 1985, has housed the Brussels City Museum since 1887, in which, among other things, the Town Hall's original sculptures are shown.

Houses of the Grand-Place

The Grand-Place is lined on each side with a number of guildhalls and a few private houses. At first modest structures, in their current form, they are largely the result of the reconstruction after the bombardment of 1695. The strongly structured facades with their rich sculptural decoration including pilasters and balustrades and their lavishly designed gables are based on Italian Baroque with some Flemish influences.

In addition to the name of the respective guild, each house has its own name. The house numbering starts at the northern corner of the square to the left of the / in a counter-clockwise direction. The most beautiful houses are probably no. 1 to 7 on the north-western side. On the south-western side, between the / and /, are the Town Hall, and the houses no. 8 to 12 to the left of it on the south-eastern side. Still on the south-eastern side, between the / and the /, are the houses no. 13 to 19. On the north-eastern side, the King's House, which is located between the / and the /, is to the right of the houses no. 20 to 28 and to the left of the houses no. 34 to 39.

Events
Festivities and cultural events are frequently organised on the Grand-Place, such as sound and light shows during the Christmas and New Year period as part of the "Winter Wonders", as well as concerts in the summer. Among the most important and famous are the Flower Carpet and the Ommegang, both taking place in the summer. The Belgian Beer Weekend, an event dedicated to Belgian beers, during which small and large breweries present their products at the Grand-Place, has taken place since 2010. The square has also been used for community gatherings and public celebrations, such as receiving athletes following sporting events.

Flower carpet

Every two years in August, coordinating with Assumption Day, an enormous flower carpet is set up in the Grand-Place for three to four days. The first Flower Carpet was created in 1971 by the Ghent landscape architect Etienne Stautemans in an effort to advertise his work, and due to its popularity, the tradition continued in subsequent years. Starting in 1986, the event has been regularly held biannually, each time under a different theme, with the Flower Carpet now attracting a large number of local and international visitors.

Ommegang of Brussels

Twice a year, at the turn of June and July, the Ommegang of Brussels, a type of medieval pageant and folkloric costumed procession, ends with a large spectacle at the Grand-Place. Historically the largest lustral procession of Brussels, which took place once a year, on the Sunday before Pentecost, since 1930, it has taken the form of a historical reenactment of the Joyous Entry of Emperor Charles V and his son Philip II in Brussels in 1549. The colourful parade includes floats, traditional processional giants, such as Saint Michael and Saint Gudula, and scores of folkloric groups, either on foot or on horseback, dressed in medieval garb. Since 2019, it is recognised as a Masterpiece of the Oral and Intangible Heritage of Humanity by UNESCO.

Christmas tree

Christmas and New Year celebrations have been held on the Grand-Place every year since 1952 or 1954. They have been officialised since 2000 as part of the "Winter Wonders" in the city centre. A Christmas tree is erected on the square for the occasion and is decorated with lights that are switched on at a seasonal ceremony, whilst the square's facades are illuminated by a sound and light show. These festivities usually take place from the end of November until the beginning of January and also attract a large number of people.

Gallery

See also

 History of Brussels
 Belgium in "the long nineteenth century"
 Peter van Dievoet (sculptor and architect)

References

Footnotes

Notes

Bibliography

Further reading

External links

 UNESCO page related to the Grand-Place
 Virtual visit, photos and webcam of the Grand-Place
 Brussels' Flowercarpet official website
 Visit the Grand-Place in 360° Photosphere
 Live WebCam

Squares in Brussels
City of Brussels
Protected heritage sites in Brussels
World Heritage Sites in Belgium
Tourist attractions in Brussels
Baroque architecture in Belgium
Car-free zones in Europe
Art by Peter Van Dievoet